Sagnarigu is a community and capital of Sagnarigu District in the Northern Region of Ghana.

History
Yakubu II was born in Sangarigu in 1945 and later went on to rule as King of Dagbon until his assassination on 27 March 2002.

On 7 November 2012, Alhaji Saani Abdul-Razak, the Northern Regional Director of the National Commission for Civic Education observed that violence promotes the destruction of pre-mature society. He convinced the people of Sagnarigu to despise violence and promote peace in the community.

Today, the community maintains its own chief palace for cultural events and is the seat of the Paramount Chief.

See also
Suburbs of Tamale (Ghana) metropolis

References 

Communities in Ghana
Suburbs of Tamale, Ghana